The Mascho Building and Public Privy is a historic building in Chandler, Oklahoma. It was designed in the Richardsonian Romanesque style, and built in 1897 with rusticated sandstone. The first owner was A. E. Mascho, who used it as a grocery store until 1913, when it was purchased by grocer John Franklin Murphy and his wife Ella. The building has been listed on the National Register of Historic Places since April 5, 1984.

References

Commercial buildings completed in 1897
National Register of Historic Places in Lincoln County, Oklahoma
Richardsonian Romanesque architecture in Oklahoma
Grocery store buildings
1897 establishments in Indian Territory
Commercial buildings on the National Register of Historic Places in Oklahoma
Restrooms in the United States
Chandler, Oklahoma